Gutteridge is a surname. Notable people with the surname include:

 Bernard Gutteridge (1916–1985), English poet
 Christopher Gutteridge, British software developer
 Don Gutteridge (1912–2008), American baseball player
 Don Gutteridge (born 1937), Canadian author
 Gordon Gutteridge (1892–1942), Australian civil engineer
 Helena Gutteridge (1879-1960), English-Canadian feminist
 Jeff Gutteridge (born 1956), English pole vaulter
 Joseph Gutteridge (1816–1899), English naturalist
 Lucy Gutteridge (born 1956), British actress
 May Gutteridge (1917–2002), English-Canadian social worker
 Melanie Gutteridge (born 1972), British actress
 Michael Gutteridge (1842–1935), English businessman and Methodist
 Michael Gutteridge (1908–1935), English athlete
 Peter Gutteridge (1961–2014), New Zealand musician
 Reg Gutteridge (1924–2009), boxing journalist
 Rob Gutteridge (born 1954), Australian artist
 Tom Gutteridge (born 1952), British television producer

See also

Guttridge
Kathleen Gutteridge, a character on the television program Coronation Street